List of Norwegian battles and sieges is a list of battles and sieges fought in Norway or which a significant number of Norwegians participated.

Unification of Norway (860-872)
Battle of Hakadal (ca. 860)
Battle of Orkdal (ca. 870)
First battle of Solskjel (ca. 870)
Second battle of Solskjel (ca. 870)
Battle of Fjaler (ca. 870)
Harald Fairhair's campaign in Götaland (870s)
Battle of Hafrsfjord (ca. 872)

900–1030

Battle of Rastarkalv (955)
Battle of Fitjar (961)
Battle of Hjørungavåg (ca. 985)
Battle of Maldon (991)
Battle of Svolder (1000)
Battle of Nesjar (1016)
Battle of Helgeå (1026)
Battle of Boknafjorden (1028)
Battle of Stiklestad (1030)

The claim to Denmark (1040–1064)
Battle of Lyrskov Heath (1043)
Battle of Niså (1062)

The British Isles (1066–1103)

Norwegian invasion of England (1066)
Battle of Fulford (1066)
Battle of Stamford Bridge (1066)
Magnus Barefoot's First Irish Sea campaign (1098–1099)
Battle of Anglesey Sound (1098)

Crusades (1107–1123)
Norwegian Crusade (1107–1111), in the aftermath of the First Crusade
Siege of Sidon (1110)
Kalmare ledung (1123)

Civil war era (1130–1240)
Battle of Minne (1137)
Battle of Holmengrå (1139)
Battle of Hising (1161)
Battle of Oslo (1161)
Battle of Sekken (1162)
Battle of Re (1163)
Battle of Re (1177)
Conquest of Jemtland
Battle of Storsjön (1178)
Battle of Kalvskinnet (1179)
Battle of Ilevollene (1180)
Battle of Fimreite (1184)
Battle of Florvåg (1194)
Battle of Tunsberg (ca. 1200)
Battle of Oslo (1218)
Battle of Oslo (1239)

The Golden Age (1240-1319)
Scottish–Norwegian War (1262–66)
Battle of Largs (1263)
War of the Outlaws (1289-1296)
Siege of Copenhagen (1289)
Battle of Skanör (1289)
Second Swedish brothers feud (1304–1310)
Battle of Oslo (1308)

House of Bjelbo (1319–1387)
Karelian raid
Raid on Bjarkøy (1323)

Kalmar Union (1389/1397–1523)
Vitalian Brotherhood
Sacking of Bergen (1393)
Conflict with Novgorod
Raid on the White Sea (1419)
Conflict with the Hanseatic League (Schleswig War) (1426–1435)
Battle of Bergen (1428)
Battle of Bergen (1429)
Conflict with Novgorod
Raid on the White Sea (1449)

Denmark–Norway (1523/1537–1807)

Olav Engelbrektssons rebellion (1536-1537)
Siege of Steinvikholm Castle (1537)
Siege of Hamar (1537)
Kalmar War (1611–13)
Battle of Kringen (1612)
Hannibal controversy (1643–45)
Battle of Bysjön (1644)
Battle of Frösöen (1644)
Battle of Vänersborg (1644)
Battle of Vänersborg (1645)
Dano-Swedish Wars (1657–58, 1658–60)
Battle of Frösöen (1657)
Battle of Eda (1658)
Battle of Trondheim (1658)
Battle of Halden (1658–60)
Battle of Borge (1660)
Second Anglo-Dutch War (1665–67)
Battle of Vågen (1665)
Scanian War (1675–79)
Battle of Oviken (1677)
Battle of Vänersborg (1677)
Battle of Marstrand (1677)
Battle of Køge Bay (1677)
Battle of Ålen (1679)
Great Northern War (1700–21)
Battle of Køge Bay (1710)
Battle of Høland (1716)
Battle of Fredriksten (1716)
Battle of Dynekilen (1716)
Battle of Moss (1716)
Battle of Nordkleiva (1716)
Battle of Norderhov (1716)
Battle of Harestuskogen (1716)
Siege of Fredriksten (1718)
Theatre War (1788-1789)
Battle of Kvistrum (1788)
French Revolutionary Wars (1792-1802)
Battle of Copenhagen (1801)

Napoleonic Wars (1807–1814)

Gunboat War (1807–14)
Battle of Copenhagen (1807)
Battle of Kristiansund (1808)
Battle of Alvøen (1808)
Battle of Lista (1808)
Battle of Lyngør (1808)
Battle of Kjerringvik (1808)
Battle of Hammerfest (1809)
Battle of Silda (1810)
Battle of Anholt (1811)
Battle of Tromsø (1812)
Battle of Lyngør (1812)
Dano-Swedish War (1808–09)
Battle of Toverud (1808)
Battle of Rødenes (1808)
Battle of Trangen (1808)
Battle of Furuholm (1808)
Battle of Mobekk (1808)
Swedish–Norwegian War (1814)
Battle of Tistedalen (1814)
Battle of Lier (1814)
Siege of Fredrikstad (1814)
Battle of Matrand (1814)
Battle of Rakkestad (1814)
Battle of Langnes (1814)
Battle of Kjølberg Bridge (1814)

World War II (1940–1945)

Invasion of Norway (1940)
Battle of Drøbak Sound (1940)
Battle of Midtskogen (1940)
Battle of Dombås (1940)
Åndalsnes landings (1940)
Namsos Campaign (1940)
Battle of Vinjesvingen (1940)
Battle of Hegra Fortress (1940)
Battles of Narvik (1940)
Battle of Gratangen (1940)
Operation Juno (1940)
Pacific War
German attacks on Nauru (1940)

Continuing the war in exile
Operation Gauntlet (1941)
Operation Kitbag (1941)
Operation Anklet (1941)
Operation Archery, aka Måløy raid (1941)
Operation Musketoon (1942)
Operation Fritham (1942–1943)
Operation Cartoon (1943)
Operation Zitronella (1943)
Battle of the Atlantic (1940–1945)
Battle of the North Cape (1943)
Western Front
Invasion of Normandy (1944)
Normandy landings (1944)
Battle of the Scheldt (1944)
The end of the war in Norway
Petsamo–Kirkenes Offensive (1944)
Black Friday (1945)

United Nations Interim Force in Lebanon (1978–1998)
Lebanese Civil War (1978-1990)
Battle of Kaukaba (1978)

War on Terror (2001–present)

War in Afghanistan (2001-2021)
Operation Anaconda (2002)
Operation Jacana (2002)
Operation Mongoose (2003)
Operation Pickaxe-Handle (2007)
Operation Harekate Yolo (2007)
Operation Karez (2008)
Counterinsurgency in Northern Afghanistan (2009–2014)

Arab Spring (2010–2012)
Libyan Civil War (2011)
2011 military intervention in Libya
Operation Odyssey Dawn (2011)
Operation Unified Protector (2011)

Sources
Norsk forsvarshistorie Bind 1, Geir Atle Ersland and Terje Holm, Eide Forlag (Norway)

Norwegian battles
Battles
Battles